Renata Berková (born May 24, 1975 in Kroměříž) is a triathlete from the Czech Republic.

Berková competed at the first Olympic triathlon at the 2000 Summer Olympics. She took twenty-ninth place with a total time of 2:08:08.37.

Four years later, Berková competed at the 2004 Summer Olympics. Her time in that competition was 2:11:50.94, placing her thirty-second.

References
Profile

Czech female triathletes
Triathletes at the 2000 Summer Olympics
Triathletes at the 2004 Summer Olympics
1975 births
Living people
Olympic triathletes of the Czech Republic
People from Kroměříž
Sportspeople from the Zlín Region